"Fan the Flames!" is Liberty University's fight song. It was written in 1989 by Dr. John Hugo, the Chairman of the Department of Music and Humanities.

The fight song is played by Liberty's marching band, "The Spirit of the Mountain", at home football games after the home team scores points. After a victory, the Liberty Flames football team sings the song to the fans on the student side grandstands.

Lyrics

References 

American college songs
College fight songs in the United States
ASUN Conference fight songs
Liberty Flames and Lady Flames
1990s songs